Francesco Arcangeli (18 May 1737 – 20 July 1768) was an Italian cook and criminal, the murderer of the famous art historian Johann Joachim Winckelmann (1717–1768).

Biography 
A native of Campiglio di Cireglio, hamlet of the municipality of Pistoia (Grand Duchy of Tuscany), Francesco Arcangeli was a cook by profession and had already been the subject of criminal convictions.

Winckelmann's murder 
Johann Joachim Winckelmann, the 50-year-old Prefect of Antiquities of Pope Clement XIII, arrived incognito, as Signor Giovanni, in Trieste (Holy Roman Empire) on 1 June 1768. He had been traveling to the north, together with a friend, the sculptor Bartolomeo Cavaceppi, to visit his native Germany after 13 years of absence. Oddly enough, in view of the Tyrolese Alps Winckelmann had panicked and pondered whether to interrupt the journey. Cavaceppi had convinced him to go as far as Vienna, where the scholar had been received and honoured by Empress Maria Theresa. Then Winckelmann, unable to withstand a German atmosphere and desperate to return to Italy, had abruptly abandoned his friend, despite his pleas, to return to the Papal States completely alone. The two friends had separated in the Habsburg capital, and Winckelmann headed for Trieste. There, he was living at the Osteria Grande (the city's main inn and present-day Grand Hotel Duchi d'Aosta, in present-day Piazza Unità d'Italia), waiting for a ship bound for Ancona, the chief Adriatic port of the Papal States, in order to reach Rome. In the inn, Winckelmann met Francesco Arcangeli, an unemployed cook and waiter, and small-time thief, who was lodged in the room next to his. Arcangeli visited Winckelmann every evening in his room where the scholar showed him his gold and silver medals, including the one Empress Maria Theresa had recently awarded him. The two spent a lot of time together, eating, walking and talking, throughout the week following their meeting. 
On 7 June, Arcangeli accompanied Winckelmann to buy a pencil and a penknife. Arcangeli returned alone that day to the same shop to buy a knife, then in another shop, a rope. The next day, 8 June 1768, he visited Winckelmann in his hotel room after dinner as he was used to. It was there that he threw himself on the intellectual to strangle him: Winckelmann pushed him away and Arcangeli pulled out his knife, they fought. In his testimony, Arcangeli said that he stabbed Winckelmann not only on the chest, but also "lower down", which is not without sexual connotations. Arcangeli then fled, leaving Winckelmann screaming down the stairs: "Look what he did to me! ". Winckelmann spent his last hours doing his will and forgave Arcangeli. He was buried the next day at the cemetery of the Trieste Cathedral. Arcangeli was arrested, however, and sentenced to death on 18 July to be beaten alive on a wheel on the square in front of the inn. The sentence was executed two days later, on 20 July.

Hypotheses 
The news of the bizarre crime spread in learned Europe and made a huge impression (Johann Wolfgang von Goethe, for example, always remembered when and where he received the news of Winckelmann's death). Winckelmann's assassination became object of many speculations and narratives in private correspondences and discourses as well as in forensic reports, articles and public speeches. Prof. Lionel Gossman, for example, believes that there are reminiscences of Winckelmann's murder, whether conscious or not, in Thomas Mann's Death in Venice (1913).

Arcangeli held six interrogations, during which he provided contradictory versions of events: he said he had killed him for believing him a spy, then only to rob him, then for believing him a Jew or a Lutheran (Arcangeli would have been suspicious of a book written with strange characters that he had noticed on the scholar's desk – but actually written in Greek). Apparently, Arcangeli did not think Signor Giovanni was rich, and in the flight after the attack he did not subtract the two medals. The strangeness of Winckelmann's behavior was also noticed, i.e. his registration under assumed name, the absence of any contact with authorities or notable people during his stay in Trieste as well as his association with a disreputable individual like Arcangeli and his reticence to openly identify himself in the hours before his death.  It is commonly thought that Winckelmann was killed during an attempted robbery, but the hypothesis of a sexual crime was also popular: contemporaries had no doubts about Winckelmann's homosexuality, seeing it as part of Winckelmann's true love for the Classical antiquity, and there was the suspicion that the scholar was killed for having made advances to an unwilling (or no longer willing, given the number of days spent together) Arcangeli.

References

Bibliography 

 
 

1737 births
1768 deaths
Italian chefs
18th-century criminals
Italian people convicted of murder
People convicted of murder by Italy
Executed Italian people
18th-century Italian people
LGBT history in Italy
Italian LGBT people
People from Pistoia
18th-century executions